Westerheim can refer to several places:

 Westerheim Township, Minnesota
 Westerheim, Baden-Württemberg, Germany
 Westerheim, Bavaria, Germany